The 2009–10 HRV Cup (named after the competition's sponsor HRV) was the fifth season of the Men's Super Smash Twenty20 cricket tournament in New Zealand. This season is the first to be sponsored by Heat recovery ventilation vendor, HRV, and was held between 2 January and 31 January 2010.

Rules and regulations

If a match ends with the scores tied, the tie is broken with a one-over-per-side Super Over.

Standings

(C) = Eventual Champion; (R) = Runner-up.
Winner qualified for the 2010 Champions League Twenty20.

Teams

League progression

Results

Group stage

Final

See also

Plunket Shield
New Zealand limited-overs cricket trophy
2009–10 Plunket Shield season
2009–10 New Zealand one-day cricket competition season

Super Smash (cricket)
Domestic cricket competitions in 2009–10
HRV